Mahmoudiyah may refer to:

Mahmoudiyah, Iraq
Mahmoudiyah, Egypt
Mahmoudiyah canal, a branch of the river Nile in Egypt

See also
Mahmudiyeh (disambiguation), places in Iran